The 2010 Richmond Spiders football team represented the University of Richmond during the 2010 NCAA Division I FCS football season. Richmond competed as a member of the Colonial Athletic Association (CAA) under first-year head football coach Latrell Scott and played its home games at the new E. Claiborne Robins Stadium. The 2010 campaign came on the heels of an NCAA Division I FCS national championship in 2008 and a quarterfinal appearance in 2009.

In the Colonial Athletic Association preseason poll, the Spiders were picked to finish 6th in the conference.  Nationally, the preseason poll from The Sports Network ranked Richmond 6th.

Schedule
Richmond's 2010 schedule kicked off against Football Bowl Subdivision (FBS) team Virginia and includes other non-conference games against Elon and Coastal Carolina.  The schedule also included an eight-game CAA slate wrapping up against rival William & Mary in the Capital Cup.

References

Richmond
Richmond Spiders football seasons
Richmond Spiders football